opened in 1970 on the sannomaru site of Saga Castle in the city of Saga, Japan, in 1970. It is one of Japan's many museums which are supported by a prefecture.

The museum displays materials relating to the natural history, archaeology, history, art, craft, and folklore of Saga Prefecture.

See also
 Hizen Province
 Saga Domain
 List of Historic Sites of Japan (Saga)
 Prefectural museum

References

External links
 Saga Prefectural Museum

History museums in Japan
Museums in Saga Prefecture
Saga (city)
Prefectural museums
Museums established in 1970
1970 establishments in Japan